Kelty Hearts Football Club is a football club based in the village of Kelty in Fife, Scotland. Formed in 1975 and nicknamed the Hearts, the Maroon Machine and the Jambos, they play their home games at New Central Park. Their home colours are maroon shirts, white shorts and maroon socks, while their away colours are typically all blue.

Kelty Hearts compete in Scottish League One, having been promoted from Scottish League Two as champions in 2022.

The club were previously members of the Scottish Junior Football Association, playing in the Fife League followed by the East Region Superleague. In December 2017 the club became a full SFA member, making them eligible to enter the Scottish Cup and move up through the pyramid system.

History 
In 1975, Kelty Hearts were formed as Kelty Hearts Amateur Football Club and worked their way up from the bottom of the Kirkcaldy & District Amateur Football Association to the top in four seasons. The club turned junior after only a few years to remain competitive with other local sides. They initially played in the Fife League, one of six regions across the country, quickly becoming one of its leading sides, then became members of the East Region in 2002 when the number was reduced to three.

Kelty reached the Scottish Junior Cup final twice but were runners-up both times: in 1999 they lost 1–0 to Kilwinning Rangers, and in 2007 they were defeated 2–1 after extra time by Linlithgow Rose.

Kelty looked to move away from being a junior side after winning the East Region Super League for the second time in 2017. The club applied for membership to join the SFA and in December 2017 became a full member, making them eligible to enter the Scottish Cup as well as progress higher up the Scottish football league system.

After being accepted into and winning the East of Scotland Football League in 2018, Kelty were promoted to the Lowland League (the fifth tier of the Scottish football league system) for the 2018–19 season after a comprehensive 10–0 aggregate win over Threave Rovers in the promotion play-off.

The team had been managed since October 2013 by Tam Courts but the club reluctantly accepted his resignation as manager on 11 October 2018.

Former Rangers and Scotland captain Barry Ferguson was announced as the club's new manager on 18 October 2018.

The 2019–20 Lowland League season was ended with immediate effect on 13 April 2020 due to the COVID-19 pandemic with Kelty Hearts being declared champions on a points per game average based on the current standings.

For the second consecutive season, Kelty were declared champions of the 2020–21 Lowland Football League on a points per game formula due to the ongoing COVID-19 pandemic. The decision was announced by the Lowland Football League on 30 March 2021. Kelty were promoted to the SPFL for the first time on 23 May 2021 after beating Brechin City 3–1 on aggregate in the Pyramid play-off final.

Continuing to make history during the 2021–22 season, Kelty, leading Scottish League Two at the time, played in the fourth round of the Scottish Cup for the first time. Facing Scottish Premiership side and cup holders St Johnstone, Kelty won 1–0 after extra time at home in front of a sold-out crowd, thanks to a goal by Kallum Higginbotham.

Kelty were promoted to Scottish League One at the first attempt with five games of the season remaining on 26 March 2022 when they beat Stenhousemuir 1–0, and nearest challengers Annan Athletic lost their match.

Ground 

Kelty Hearts play their home games at New Central Park, situated just off Bath Street in Kelty.

The overall capacity of New Central Park is 2,181 and consists of two covered enclosures which can hold around 1,030 spectators in total and a seated stand with a capacity of 354. There is a social club and a sports bar/hospitality lounge within the ground. The pitch at New Central Park has a 3G MX artificial surface, which was installed in 2015 along with floodlights.

Dunfermline Athletic Reserves also play their home games at New Central Park.

Supporters 
The majority of supporters of Kelty Hearts come from the village of Kelty and surrounding areas in Fife.

Kelty are also known to attract many groundhoppers due to the club's good reputation as hosts on matchdays.

Rivalries 
Kelty share a fierce local rivalry with East of Scotland team Hill of Beath Hawthorn. Both clubs were founded in the same year in 1975. The rivalry mainly stems from the close proximity of the two clubs and both being very successful junior sides within the Fife League, often exchanging league title wins from year to year and frequently meeting in the cup competitions. Kelty are currently two leagues above Hill of Beath; however, they can still face each other in the Scottish Cup.

Kelty's other rivals include Linlithgow Rose and Bonnyrigg Rose, two successful former East junior sides, who they have faced in both league and cup competitions over the years.

Upon gaining promotion to the SPFL, Kelty compete in the bigger Fife derbies, with their closest rivals being Cowdenbeath, the two separated by just .

Current squad

On loan
}

Staff

Coaching staff

Managers

Season-by-season record
† Season curtailed due to COVID-19 pandemic - Kelty were announced as champions for the 2019–20 and 2020–21 season. A points per game basis was used to finalise standings.

Honours

Senior
League Two
Winners: 2021–22
Lowland League
Winners: 2019–20, 2020–21

East of Scotland Football League
Winners: 2017–18

King Cup
 Winners: 2017–18

Junior
East Region Super League
Winners: 2014–15, 2016–17
Runners-up: 2015–16

Scottish Junior Cup
Runners-up: 1998–99, 2006–07

SJFA East Region Premier League
Runners-up: 2006–07

SJFA Fife District League: 2002–03
Fife Junior League winners: 1990–91, 1991–92, 1992–93, 1996–97, 1998–99
Fife Junior (PSM) Cup: 1982–83, 1983–84, 1984–85, 1986–87, 1992–93, 2007–08, 2008–09
Fife & Tayside (Taycars) Trophy Winners 1997–98
Cowdenbeath (Interbrew) Cup: 1981–82, 1984–85, 1985–86, 1986–87, 1992–93, 1999–00
Fife Drybrough Cup: 1981–82
Laidlaw Shield winners: 1984–85, 1986–87
Clark Beckett Cup: 1993–94
ACA Sports Fife League Cup: 2006–07
Maloco Associates (Fife) Cup: 2007–08, 2008–09
Rosslyn Trophy Winners: 1991–92, 1996–97

References

External links
 Official club site
 Facebook
 Twitter

 
Football clubs in Scotland
Scottish Junior Football Association clubs
Football clubs in Fife
Association football clubs established in 1975
1975 establishments in Scotland
Kelty
East of Scotland Football League teams
Lowland Football League teams
Scottish Professional Football League teams